The Zapotec culture is polytheist. Notable deities include:

Cocijo, god of rain
Coquihani, god of light
Copijcha, god of war
Chicomostoc
Cozobi, god of maize
Pecala, god of dreams

See also
 Zapotec civilization